Jalil Juan José Elías (born 25 April 1996) is an Argentine professional footballer who plays as a midfielder for Argentine Primera División club San Lorenzo.

Career
Elías' career started with Newell's Old Boys in 2015, beginning in the youth system. He was an unused substitute in two Argentine Primera División matches in June and October 2015 against Boca Juniors and Nueva Chicago respectively. His professional debut arrived on 23 November 2015, he played the full ninety minutes in a Copa Sudamericana qualification play-off with Lanús. He followed that with twenty-seven league appearances in his following three campaigns with Newell's Old Boys between 2016 and 2017. He scored his first career goal on 11 June 2017 in a Copa Argentina win over Central Norte.

In January 2018, Elías joined Godoy Cruz on loan until June 2019. Prior to departing, he signed a new contract with Newell's Old Boys until 2021. Like with his parent club, his debut for Godoy Cruz came versus Lanús. He appeared fourteen times for Godoy, with the club subsequently signing him permanently in the following August. He made thirty appearances in 2018–19, prior to leaving on loan in July 2019 to Unión Santa Fe. Elías scored one goal across one season with them; he netted in a 3–3 draw away to Banfield on 3 November. In mid-2020, he was linked with a transfer to Italy with Parma.

Personal life
Born in Argentina, Elías is of Syrian descent.

Career statistics
.

References

External links

1996 births
Living people
Footballers from Rosario, Santa Fe
Argentine people of Syrian descent
Argentine footballers
Association football midfielders
Argentine Primera División players
Newell's Old Boys footballers
Godoy Cruz Antonio Tomba footballers
Unión de Santa Fe footballers
San Lorenzo de Almagro footballers